Se hace por los suenos asesinos is the third full-length studio album by Japanese doom metal band Corrupted. It was released on January 17, 2004 on vinyl limited to 1000 copies, and again on April 16, 2004 on limited-edition CD.

The title is Spanish for "It Is Done for Assassin Dreams", although the technical Spanish translation for "dreams" is sueños, not suenos; the tilde was left off the title.

Track listing

Personnel
Talbot – acoustic guitar, electric guitar
Yokota – bass guitar, acoustic guitar
Chew Hasegawa – drums
Hevi – vocals, acoustic guitar

Corrupted (band) albums
2004 albums